Turbo Drop is a model of tower-based amusement ride manufactured by S&S - Sansei Technologies, similar to the company's Space Shot.

Design and operation
The ride is a vertical drop tower. The car is held for multiple seconds, before it is launched downwards with a force of 1.5G, dropping almost to the ground. The compressed air 'bounces' the car back to halfway, before it is lowered to the loading dock. As the tower is four-sided, up to sixteen passengers can ride simultaneously.

Appearances 
 The Abyss Turbo Drop at Ocean Park in Hong Kong
 Dominator at Dorney Park & Wildwater Kingdom in Allentown, Pennsylvania, USA
 Discovery at Mirabilandia in Savio di Ravenna, Italy
 Down Time at Lake Compounce in Bristol, Connecticut, USA
 Dragons Descent at Funtown Splashtown USA In Saco, Maine, USA
 Det Gyldne Tårn at Tivoli Gardens in Copenhagen, Denmark
 Hellevator at Playland in Vancouver, Canada
 Höjdskräcken  at Liseberg in Gothenburg, Sweden
 Hysteria at Dunia Fantasi in Jakarta, Indonesia
 Kilahuea at Six Flags Mexico in Mexico City, Mexico
 Power Tower at Cedar Point in Sandusky, Ohio, USA
 Power Tower at Valleyfair in Shakopee, Minnesota, USA
 The Rocket at Lagoon Amusement Park in Farmington, Utah, USA
 Sasquatch at Great Escape in Queensbury, New York, USA
 Scream! at Six Flags New England in Agawam, Massachusetts, USA
 Scream! at Six Flags Fiesta Texas in San Antonio, Texas, USA
 Skyborne at Lost Island Theme Park in Waterloo, Iowa, USA
 Superman: Tower of Power at Six Flags Over Texas in Arlington, Texas, USA
 Supreme Scream at Knott's Berry Farm in Buena Park, California, USA
 Turbo Drop at Buffalo Bill's Hotel and Casino in Primm, Nevada, USA

External links

 

Drop tower rides
S&S – Sansei Technologies